The Slater family is an American philanthropic, political, and manufacturing family from England, Rhode Island, Massachusetts, and Connecticut whose members include the "Father of the American Industrial Revolution," Samuel Slater, a prominent textile tycoon who founded America's first textile mill, Slater Mill (1790), and with his brother John Slater founded Slatersville, Rhode Island in North Smithfield, Rhode Island in 1803, America's first planned mill village. The family includes various merchants, inventors, art patrons, and socialites. John Fox Slater, was a prominent abolitionist who founded the Slater Fund and built the historic John F. Slater House and Slater Library. William A. Slater was a noted art collector and philanthropist who created the Slater Memorial Museum in Connecticut.  After moving many of their mills to the South from New England, the village of Slater-Marietta, South Carolina was named after the family.

Family members 

William Slater (1728–1782) & Elizabeth Slater, farmers in the UK
Samuel Slater (1768–1835), (founder of Slater Mill) married Hannah Slater (Wilkinson) (1774–1812) (first woman to receive a patent in the U.S.)
John Slater (1805–1837), first representative of the town of Webster, Massachusetts in the Massachusetts General Court
George Slater (1804–1843), one of the first selectman of Webster, Massachusetts
Horatio Nelson Slater (1808–1888), owner of mills in Webster, Massachusetts
Horatio Nelson Slater, Jr (1835–1899) Mill owner in Webster
Horatio Nelson Slater III (1892–1968) founder Slater-Marietta, South Carolina, where he moved mill operations from Massachusetts
John Slater (1776–1843), co-founder of Slatersville, Rhode Island
John Fox Slater (1815–1885), abolitionist, philanthropist to African American causes
William A. Slater (1857–1919), art patron, donor of the Slater Memorial Museum at Norwich Free Academy
William A. Slater, Jr., businessman
Eleanor Halsley Malone (Slater), New York and Washington DC socialite
Adrian Halsey Malone (1915–2006), architect, designed Buffalo Bill Center of the West in Cody and the Bradford Brinton Museum
William Slater

References

See also 
Slater Park
Slater Park Zoo

Further reading 
Slatersville, Rhode Island History
Barbara M. Tucker, Samuel Slater and the origins of the American textile industry: 1984
George Savage White, Memoir of Samuel Slater: the father of American manufactures  1836
Slater Family Records at Harvard Business School

American families
Business families of the United States